Alan Baker may refer to:

Alan Baker (politician) (born 1956), American politician
Alan T. Baker (born 1956), United States Navy chaplain
Alan Baker (mathematician) (1939–2018), English mathematician
Alan Baker (footballer) (born 1944), footballer for Aston Villa football club, 1960–66
Alan Baker (diplomat) (born 1947), former Israel ambassador to Canada
Alan Baker (poet) (born 1958), British poet
Alan Baker (philosopher), Professor of Philosophy and shogi player
 Alan Baker (historian), author of Invisible Eagle and other books

See also
Al Baker (disambiguation)